The Waterman Mountains are a low mountainous landform in Pima County, United States. Notable among the tree species is the elephant tree (Bursera microphylla) which species exhibits a contorted multi-furcate architecture; most of these froze in the cold winter of 2011. The Waterman Mountain range is in the Ironwood Forest National Monument.

The Waterman Mountains are not extensive, and merge into the southern section of the Silver Bell Mountains. The south of the range abuts the northwest of the northwest–southeast trending Roskruge Mountains.

Prehistoric ecology
The prehistoric ecology and plant community of the Waterman Mountains area of Arizona has been reconstructed to its composition as far back as the last glacial period, the Late Wisconsin glacial period. Dominant trees of that era, based upon pollen records, were Utah juniper (Juniperus osteosperma), single-leaf pinyon (Pinus monophylla), and redberry juniper (Juniperus pinchotii), along with canotia (Canotia holacantha), and understory plants including Monardella arizonica.

References

Sources
 C. Michael Hogan. 2009. Elephant Tree: Bursera microphylla, GlobalTwitcher.com, ed. N. Stromberg
 Neal Erskine McClymonds. 1957. The stratigraphy and structure of the Waterman Mountains, Pima County, Arizona 314 pages

External links
 Waterman Peak Summit, (coord)

Flora of Arizona
Mountain ranges of the Sonoran Desert
Mountain ranges of Pima County, Arizona
Mountain ranges of Arizona